Lê Trung Thành (born October 13, 1997),  formed by V-MAS - a Vietnam entertainment agency which manages artists contain Lan Khue, Erik, DTAP, Phuong My Chi and produces music for artists and brands. He also known by his stage name Erik, is a Vietnamese singer and dancer. He joined The Voice Kids of Vietnam in 2013 and later became a member of Monstar. He has won four nominations at the Dedication Music Award, and was the only artist nominated twice for the "New Artist of the Year" category.

Life and career

1997–2015: Childhood and The Voice Kids of Vietnam 
Erik was born on October 13, 1997, in Hanoi. At first, his family opposed Erik of choosing an art path, but eventually came into an agreement to allow Erik to pursue his music career if he passed the Blind Auditions on The Voice Kids of Vietnam in 2013. He managed to pass the round, and joined coach Hiền Thục. Erik later finished 15th place on the program. In addition to his participation in The Voice Kids of Vietnam, Erik also participated in a number of other music competitions and received encouraging achievements.

After his appearance on The Voice Kids of Vietnam 2013, Erik participated in St.319 Entertainment's intership contest in January 2015 and was officially selected to be the company's trainee, following a comprehensive training contract, modelled after the Korean entertainment industry.

2016–17: "Sau tất cả" and "Ghen" 
After the training period, Erik officially debuted with his first song entitled "Sau tất cả" (lit. After All) on January 11, 2016, on appearing the Youtube channel of St.319 Entertainment. Two days later, another video was released for Erik's debut, suggesting him to be the first member of the project group, Monstar. On January 15, the official music video for "Sau tất cả" was released on St.319 Entertainment's Youtube channel. The song quickly gained attention, not only in the V-pop fandom but also by the general public during the first half of 2016, bring him fame and awards. Sau tất cả was also on the list of "Classic Sayings on Social Media in 2016" voted by VnExpress, in addition to being covered by many singers, celebrities and international fans. In the mainstream media, this song was dubbed as the "national song" of Vietnam. The Vietnamese magazine, Hoa Học Trò noted the success of the song made viewers "'startled' by a few rookies using their feet" on showbiz but had an impressive pitch and had such a lasting impact.

In the first half of 2016, Erik participated in recording for two soundtrack songs including "Yeu & Yeu" (Love & Love) which is the OST of the movie "Benh vien ma" (Ghost Hospital) and "Tôi là ai trong em" (Who am I in you) of the movie "Taxi! Em tên gì? (Taxi! What's your name?). In the second half of 2016, after releasing the recording and choreography of the song "Turn It Up", on September 6, St.319 Entertainment officially released the MV for the debut of a new group called Monstar consisting of three members, Erik, Nicky, Key, in which Erik is the main vocal of the group. In December, as a Vietnam-Korea Tourism Ambassador selected by the Korea National Administration of Tourism, Monstar participated in a series of tourism promotion activities in Korea, in which the highlight was the launch of The music video promoting Korean tourism is titled "Love Rain". The MV features actress Choi Jin Hee, who played the role of nurse Park Kwan Hee in the movie Descendants of the Sun. In the last days of 2016 and the beginning of 2017, Erik continued to release another solo product of his, the song "Lạc nhau có phải muôn đời" (Is it lost forever), this is the OST song for the movie "Chờ em đến ngày mai" (Waiting for you until tomorrow). The song includes an audio track and an MV. This song and the success of the previous soundtrack songs helped Erik be officially nicknamed by the media and the audience as "The Prince of Soundtrack". Participating in the MV has the presence of two main actors, model Quang Dai and Miss Teen 2012 Thu Trang.

In 2017, Erik decided to leave Monstar and St.319 Entertainment and become a freelance singer. In later activities, many times Erik and Monstar attended the same event, they still freely talked and took pictures together. Three months later, Erik as a freelance singer teamed up with another former St.319 Entertainment singer, Min, to release a new MV Ghen. The MV has received a lot of attention from the audience, marking his strong comeback as well as the excitement when the two artists are singers who used to be a part in St.319 Entertainment in the past. The song was produced by AD Production and composed by musician Khac Hung, this is considered another interesting coincidence when Khac Hung is the one who collaborated with St.319 Entertainment to produce Erik's remarkable song "Sau Tat Ca" (After All). This song also achieved high achievements on Vietnamese music charts, after more than 4 days of airing, Ghen has reached 3.5 million views and ranked first on the top trending of the song on YouTube Vietnam.

2018 - present: Released "Ghen Cô Vy", "Em không sai, chúng ta sai", "Anh luôn là lý do" and participated in The Heroes 
After leaving St.319 Entertainment, Erik was an artist of HI Entertainment. The first product after joining HI Entertainment was the song "Đừng xin lỗi nữa" (Don't Apologize), which attracted a lot of attention from audience, especially from the audience of the movie Lala: Let me love you. After the success of the song "Đừng xin lỗi nữa" (Don't Apologize)", HI Entertainment has continued to collaborate with a Korean musician to release the song "Mình chia tay đi" (Let's break up), which leaving many good impressions of audience for Erik, especially from the audience of the movie "Cua lại vợ bầu" (Flirt my wife again). Erik's most successful product at HI Entertainment is the super hit "Chạm đáy nỗi đau" (At the bottom of the pain), which has won a resounding success, quickly surpassing the milestone of 100 million views on YouTube. Following the success of that song, Erik continued to release the next two products, "Đừng có mơ" (Stop Dreamming) and "Anh ta là sao" (Who is He). In February 2019, Erik continued his successful journey when collaborating with a famous group in Korea that is Momoland. According to the plan, the joint product between Erik and the Momoland will be released in May 2019. On July 28, 2019, Erik officially released the new MV "Có tất cả nhưng thiếu anh" (Having it all but missing you) and then quickly reached the top 1 trending YouTube Vietnam only 1 day after the MV was released.

In 2020, in the context of the COVID-19 pandemic, he collaborated with female singer Min to release the song "Ghen Cô Vy" to propagate epidemic prevention, the song soon achieved relative success internationally and became a viral video, praised by many music magazines including Billboard.

On 6 May 2020, Erik released the new MV "Em không sai, chúng ta sai" (You are not wrong, we are wrong). This ballad song was composed by musician Nguyen Phuc Thien, and the MV was performed by director Dinh Ha Uyen Thu. This is also the first time Miss Vietnam 2018 Tran Tieu Vy has starred in an MV. This song has an attractive, easy-to-listen melody that shows the strength of Erik's voice. The song is about a boy's regret and torment when he can't keep his lover with him.

In January 2021, Erik released the new MV "Anh luôn là lý do" (I'm Always the Reason). After that, he participated in the program The Heroes 2021. Erik was the champion with 9.88 points, thanks to the song Nam Quốc Sơn Hà which is related and contains national spirit. He wore ao dai and performed a new song composed by the producer team DTAP. The song "Máu đỏ da vàng" has a world music sound, mixed with a little house to create a fast-paced, joyful rhythm. Erik sings, raps, tells stories about Vietnamese people rising from difficulties, with the strength of solidarity, they can overcome all challenges.

On January 26, 2022, Erik released the MV "Yêu đương khó quá thì chạy về khóc với anh" (Cry with me if love is too hard). This is a song with bold Asian characteristics in terms of images and melodies. The song has created love with the audience and was covered by a lot of audience dancing and singing.

On 11 July 2022, Erik released the soundtrack of "Là mây trên bầu trời của ai đó" (Being a cloud in someone's sky). Erik sang this song sweetly.

On 1 August 2022, Erik collaborated with Vietnam's most mysterious producer W/n in the song 3107. Erik and producer W/n stayed up all night to tweak each sound.

On 11 November 2022, Erik officially announced the company ENS Entertainment (a part of V-MAS).

On 15 November 2022, Erik released the soundtrack of the movie "Hạnh phúc máu" (Blood Happiness).

Discography

Mini album 

 DCM The First Mini Album (2018)

Singles

Music Videos

Soundtrack (OST)

Awards & nomination

International

Vietnam

References

External links 

Living people
21st-century Vietnamese male singers
1997 births